Donner Ski Ranch is a budget-oriented, family owned ski area located on Donner Summit in the Tahoe National Forest of Nevada County, California. It is owned by Janet and Marshall Tuttle, who purchased it after it went into bankruptcy. The area it is on has been used for skiing since 1937.  It has ski lifts on both sides of Donner Summit, and is located close to Sugar Bowl Ski Resort. 25% of its terrain is beginner, 50% intermediate, and 25% advanced, but of the 52 runs 16 are of beginning difficulty, 20 are intermediate, and 16 are advanced.

The rustic lodge, built-in 1947, is mostly made of wood, and has open pipes. Norm Sayler began working for Donner Ski Ranch in 1958, helping to build the ski area’s first chairlift in 1955. Sayler took over the management of the resort in 1958, and ran it for the next 46 years, while slowly acquiring most of the ownership. The rustic lodge was renovated after its acquisition by its current owners.  At the time of the acquisition, all of the ski lifts were painted as well.

References

External links
 Donner Ski Ranch official website

Ski areas and resorts in California
Tahoe National Forest
Tourist attractions in Nevada County, California
Companies based in Nevada County, California